Acacia longispinea is a shrub or tree of the genus Acacia and the subgenus Plurinerves that is endemic to an area of south western Australia.

Description
The shrub or tree typically grows to a height of  It has glabrous and terete branchlets and lenticellular branchlets that are scarred by raised stem-projections from lost phyllodes. Like most species of Acacia it has phyllodes rather than true leaves. The rigid, glabrous, pungent and evergreen phyllodes are ascending to erect and straight to shallowly incurved with a pentagonal cross section. It blooms from September to October and produces yellow flowers. The simple inflorescences occur singly and have spherical flower-heads with a diameter of  containing 60 to 85 densely packed golden coloured flowers.

Taxonomy
The species was first formally described by the botanist Alexander Morrison in 1912 in The Scottish Botanical Review. It was reclassified as Racosperma longispineum by Leslie Pedley in 2003 then returned to genus Acacia in 2014. It is thought to be closely related to Acacia gonophylla which also has pentagonal phyllodes.

Distribution
It is native to an area in the Mid West, Wheatbelt and Goldfields-Esperance regions of Western Australia where it is usually situated on low rises and sandplains growing in gravelly, sandy or clay loam soils as a part of shrubland communities. The range of the plant extends from Hamelin Pool Marine Nature Reserve in the north west down to around Narembeen and Boorabbin in the south east with other smaller populations found near Albion Downs and Comet Vale further to the east.

See also
 List of Acacia species

References

longispinea
Acacias of Western Australia
Plants described in 1912